Not So Commercial is the seventh studio album recorded by Venezuelan band Los Amigos Invisibles. Released on 15 March 2011, it was nominated in the Best Latin Pop, Rock or Urban Album category at the 2012 Grammy Awards.

Track listing
This information adapted from AllMusic.

References 

Los Amigos Invisibles albums